"I Will, If You Will" is a song written by Randy Goodrum and John Barlow Jarvis, and recorded by American country music artist John Berry.  It was released in April 1997 as the third single from the album Faces.  They reached #19 on the Billboard Hot Country Singles & Tracks chart.

Chart performance

References

1997 singles
1997 songs
John Berry (country singer) songs
Songs written by Randy Goodrum
Songs written by John Barlow Jarvis
Capitol Records Nashville singles